Gerald Augustin Drew (June 20, 1903 - September 27, 1970) was a career Foreign Service Officer for the United States.

Biography
Born in San Francisco, California, Drew was a graduate of the University of California, Berkeley where he was a member of Phi Kappa Tau. He served as U.S. Vice Consul in Pará, 1929; Envoy to Jordan, 1950–52; Ambassador to Bolivia, 1954–57; Ambassador to Haiti, 1957–60. He was assigned to Haiti by the Dwight D. Eisenhower administration at the beginning of the regime of François Duvalier. He criticized the Duvalier government, and Duvalier requested his removal, but this was rejected by Christian Herter.

He died at Lewes, Delaware and is buried at Rock Creek Cemetery, Washington, D.C.

External links

References

|-

|-

1903 births
1970 deaths
Ambassadors of the United States to Bolivia
Ambassadors of the United States to Haiti
Ambassadors of the United States to Jordan
Burials at Rock Creek Cemetery
Directors General of the United States Foreign Service
People from Los Angeles
United States Foreign Service personnel
University of California, Berkeley alumni
20th-century American diplomats
American expatriates in Brazil